"Carolina in the Morning" is a popular song with words by Gus Kahn and music by Walter Donaldson, first published in 1922 by Jerome H. Remick & Co.

The song debuted on Broadway in the elaborate and risqué musical revue The Passing Show of 1922 at the Winter Garden Theater. Vaudeville performers incorporated it into their acts and helped popularize it.  Among these was William Frawley, who later sang it in Paramount Pictures' original version of The Lemon Drop Kid in 1934, as well as the 1952 episode "Ricky Loses His Voice" of I Love Lucy, and the 1963 season 3 episode "Evening with a Star" of My Three Sons, where it generated moderate attention.

Notable recordings when the song was new were made by such artists as Marion Harris, Van & Schenck, Paul Whiteman and the American Quartet.

"Carolina in the Morning" gradually became a standard, being revived regularly as a popular song into the 1950s. Al Jolson recorded it on June 11, 1947 and he featured it in the film Jolson Sings Again (1949).  Danny Winchell had a hit with his version in 1952.

Other artists to have later successes with the song included Bing Crosby who recorded the song in 1956 for use on his radio show and it was subsequently included in the box set The Bing Crosby CBS Radio Recordings (1954-56) issued by Mosaic Records (catalog MD7-245) in 2009. He subsequently used it in his album A Southern Memoir. Other notable versions were by Dean Martin (for his album Swingin' Down Yonder), Jimmy Durante, Dinah Shore (for her album Dinah Down Home!), Judy Garland, and Danny Kaye. 
In 1957, Bill Haley & His Comets recorded a rock and roll version. Freddy Cannon recorded this song on his debut 1960 album The Explosive Freddy Cannon.

It was also performed by Dick Van Dyke and Mary Tyler Moore on The Dick Van Dyke Show and by Vivian Vance and William Frawley on I Love Lucy.

Film appearances
Hollywood Cavalcade (1939) - played by a studio orchestra for the 'Common Clay' scene
The Roaring Twenties (1939) - played when Eddie goes to the theater
Greenwich Village (1944) - played when Querida first approaches Ken
The Dolly Sisters (1945) - performed by Betty Grable and June Haver 
April Showers (1948)
Jolson Sings Again (1949) - performed by Larry Parks (dubbed by Al Jolson).
Always Leave Them Laughing (1949) - Hummed by Alan Hale and danced by him, Grace Hayes, Ruth Roman (singing voice  dubbed by Trudy Erwin) and Milton Berle.
Look for the Silver Lining (1949) - Played backstage when Marilyn first sees her family. Also performed by Ray Bolger on-stage
Young Man with a Horn (1950) - played by Young Rick and other kids
I'll See You in My Dreams (1951) - sung by Patrice Wymore (dubbed by Bonnie Lou Williams) 
The Winning Team (1952) - played during the carnival dressing room scene
Strangers on a Train (1951) - Played when buying ice cream at the amusement park
Con Air (1997)
28 Days (2000) - performed by Mitch Miller

Lyrics 
The original 1922 lyrics are now public domain in the United States due to age. The chorus remains well known, but the verses have generally been omitted from vocal performances since the early years of the song's popularity. The verses give a hint of melancholy to the song, while the chorus on its own can be an almost ecstatic reverie.

The popular chorus has a catchy melody, constructed more creatively by Walter Donaldson than most Tin Pan Alley popular songs of the era. Gus Kahn's clever lyrics use playful wording and subsidiary rhymes within lines in a manner found in some of the better novelty songs of the era, but seldom found in songs where the effect was romantic rather than comic.

Use
"Carolina in the Morning" has been used in public celebrations in the states North Carolina and South Carolina. It is also frequently sung by collegiate a cappella groups. The song was also recorded by Brent Spiner for his 1991 album Ol' Yellow Eyes Is Back. Among the more colorful renditions of this song was in the Warner Bros. cartoon Book Revue (1946) in which Daffy Duck sings a Russian-accented version, imitating a then famous Danny Kaye characterization, saying "feener", "Caroleena", etc.,  while wearing a zoot suit. Moreover, Warner Brothers utilized the song as part of the musical score of many of their Merrie Melodies and Looney Tunes cartoons. In 1951, Alfred Hitchcock chose a mechanical-orchestra version to play at an amusement park as a prelude to Miriam's murder in Strangers on a Train.

Performance artist and comedian Andy Kaufman often performed the song as his character Tony Clifton, e.g. during The Midnight Special he hosted in 1981, and two years earlier, in 1979, at Carnegie Hall, where Kaufman appeared on one stage with Clifton (presumably played by Bob Zmuda) for a duet.

The opening line of the song was spoofed in the 1997 film Con Air when Cyrus "the Virus" Grissom sings, "Oh, nothing makes me sadder than the agent lost his bladder in the airplane!" It was also spoofed as the title of a book by Charles Osgood: Nothing Could Be Finer Than a Crisis That Is Minor in the Morning.

WECT TV in Wilmington, North Carolina airs a morning newscast called Carolina in the Morning.

References 

1922 songs
Pop standards
Al Jolson songs
Bill Haley songs
Judy Garland songs
Songs with music by Walter Donaldson
Songs with lyrics by Gus Kahn
The Muppets songs